Umar Mosque is a mosque in Evington, Leicester, England.
The building was completed in 2000. The building is named after the 2nd Caliph and companion of the Holy Messenger of Allah Muhammad Sallallahu ‘alaihi Wa Salam

References

External links

Masjid Umar
BBC Leicester - A 360 Degrees image of Masjid Umar "The architecture and decoration inside are a sight to behold."
http://www.masjid-umar.org

2000 establishments in England
Buildings and structures in Leicester
Mosques in England
Mosques completed in 2000